"Turkeys Away" is the seventh episode of the first season of the American sitcom television series WKRP in Cincinnati. It aired on October 30, 1978 and was co-written by story editor Bill Dial and series creator Hugh Wilson.  In the episode, station manager Arthur Carlson attempts to pull off the greatest Thanksgiving promotion in radio history: dropping live turkeys from a helicopter.

Based on an actual promotion for a radio station that tossed live turkeys off the back of a truck, Turkeys Away has been praised by fans and critics and is widely considered to be the most famous episode of the series (frequently replayed during the Thanksgiving season) and one of the best episodes in television history.

Synopsis
Station manager Arthur Carlson attempts to get more involved in the day-to-day operations of WKRP by coming up with a Thanksgiving publicity stunt that he keeps secret from the entire staff, save for sales manager Herb Tarlek: a special turkey giveaway, dropping the live birds from a helicopter outside a busy shopping center with a banner that reads "Happy Thanksgiving from WKRP."

On-the-scene reporter Les Nessman delivers a dramatic play-by-play of the ill-conceived event at the Pinedale shopping mall, live on the air, as Carlson and Tarlek plunge the turkeys to their deaths off the helicopter "like sacks of wet cement." The crowd begins to run for their lives as the turkeys violently crash into the ground. At one point, Nessman evokes Herbert Morrison's emotional description of the 1937 Hindenburg disaster, "One just went through the windshield of a parked car. This is terrible, Oh, the humanity!"

Disc jockey Dr. Johnny Fever, Andy Travis, Venus Flytrap and Bailey Quarters recoil in horror as Nessman recounts the gory details until his transmission is cut.

Fever concludes the segment by quipping, "For those of you who just tuned in, the Pinedale shopping mall has just been bombed with live turkeys...Film at 11!"

Following the incident, the station is bombarded with phone calls from the Humane Society and the Cincinnati mayor. Travis attempts to assuage the mayor's concerns by saying no humans were hurt during the incident.

Both Carlson and Tarlek return to the station in a disheveled state from the disastrous promotion. Carlson is incredulous that his idea went so awry. A distressed Nessman also returns, recounting how he jammed himself into a phone booth after some members of the crowd began to descend on him. He also revealed that the surviving turkeys mounted a counter-attack.

The episode ends with Carlson telling the staff, "As God is my witness, I thought turkeys could fly."

Cast

 Gary Sandy as Andy Travis
 Gordon Jump as Arthur Carlson
 Loni Anderson as Jennifer Marlowe
 Richard Sanders as Les Nessman
 Tim Reid as Venus Flytrap
 Frank Bonner as Herb Tarlek
 Jan Smithers as Bailey Quarters
 Howard Hesseman as Dr. Johnny Fever
 Michael Fairman as the shoe store owner

Background
The plot of "Turkeys Away" is based on a true story. WKRP in Cincinnati creator Hugh Wilson — who adapted Carlson's character from Jerry Blum, a general manager of radio station WQXI in Atlanta from 1960 to 1989 — recounted that the episode was inspired by a similar live turkey giveaway promotion by Blum, who tossed turkeys out of a pick-up truck at a Dallas shopping center parking lot.

According to The Atlanta Journal-Constitution, Blum said in 1996 that following the disastrous promotion, he quipped, "I didn’t know turkeys couldn't fly," almost word-for-word what Carlson says at the end of the episode.

"The public went nuts fighting over the turkeys and it was a mess," Blum said. "That was about the whole story... To my knowledge, the turkey drop was never repeated."

Other aerial turkey drops have also been documented in Yellville, Arkansas, where the local Chamber of Commerce has over the years sponsored the Turkey Trot Festival and featured turkeys being dropped from a low-flying airplane.

Reception
"Turkeys Away" is widely considered the most famous, and revered episode of WKRP in Cincinnati, appearing on many lists of the greatest television episodes of all-time.

The A.V. Club's Brandon Nowalk called Richard Sanders's description of the turkey drop "creative and gruesome and downright hilarious," adding, "The whole gag happens offscreen, including the turkeys apparently organizing a counterattack, but vivid lines like that and Sanders' shell-shocked delivery, not to mention the way he's hugging the wall, make it come alive."

In 1997 TV Guide ranked "Turkeys Away" episode at number 40 on its '100 Greatest Episodes of All Time' list. In 2009, it moved to #65.

References

External links

1978 American television episodes
Thanksgiving television episodes
Works based on actual events
WKRP in Cincinnati
Television episodes set in Ohio